Faya-Largeau (also known as Faya,  or ) is the largest city in northern Chad and was the capital of the region of Bourkou-Ennedi-Tibesti. It is now in the Borkou Region, which was formed in 2008 from the Borkou Department of the former Bourkou-Ennedi-Tibesti region.

History
Originally called Faya, the town was renamed Largeau after French Colonel Victor Emmanuel Largeau; upon Chadian independence from France, it assumed the name Faya-Largeau. The town was captured by Libya when Libya annexed the Aouzou Strip in 1975, but was retaken by Hissène Habré's forces in 1980. Libya recaptured Faya-Largeau in 1983, but retreated in 1987.

Economy
Due to the considerable underground water supply in the town, the main economic activities are agriculture and natron mining. The town is serviced by Faya-Largeau Airport  with a paved runway, used almost exclusively by military airplanes.

Demographics

Climate
Faya-Largeau has a hot desert climate typical of the Borkou Region lying on the heart of the Sahara Desert. Annual precipitation averages only  and generally only occurs from June to September, although some years have no rainfall at all. The sunshine duration is one of the highest found in the world with some 3,800 hours of bright sunshine annually, and every month receives an average sunshine duration above 290 hours.

Notable people
 Idriss Ndélé Moussa, dentist, academic, and politician

See also
Chadian–Libyan conflict

References

External links

Populated places in Chad
Borkou Region